Seoul Chinese Primary School or Hanxiao Chinese Primary School is a Republic of China (Taiwan)-oriented Chinese international primary school located in Myeongdong, in Jung-gu, Seoul. It is in the center of the Myeongdong.

Most of its classes are taught in Chinese. The school offers training programs for spoken Mandarin, and it has programs modeled on those of the ROC. Its textbooks originate from the ROC.

Graduates of this school may attend Seoul Overseas Chinese High School.

History
Chinese immigrants founded the school in 1909.

From the 1950s through the 1970s the student body numbered around 2,000 but preferences for education of the children in Mainland China, Taiwan, and the United States combined with a decline in the area birthrate caused the student population to decline down with the lowest number being 500 in 2008. The student body figures began to recover due to a trend promoting the study of the Chinese language; Korean families began sending their children to the school so they could learn Chinese. The president of the school's board of directors, Sui Hsing-chin, stated that the school began admitting non-Chinese students to promote the acceptance of ethnic Chinese in Korean society. In 2009 the school had about 600 students.

The school celebrated its 100-year anniversary in 2009. The Ambassador of the People's Republic of China to South Korea, Cheng Yonghua, attended the event. He congratulated the school and stated that the Embassy of the People's Republic of China in Seoul will offer support to the school.

Student body
 the school had 700 students, with 70-80% being overseas Chinese and the remainder including Korean students as well as Japanese, English, and French pupils.  most of the students were born in South Korea.

Notable alumni
Joo Hyun-mi, trot singer
Kang Rae-yeon, actress and model

See also

 Chinese people in Korea
 South Korea–Taiwan relations
 China-Korea relations (pre-World War II)
 Korean schools in Taiwan:
 Taipei Korean Elementary School (타이뻬이한국학교)
 Kaohsiung Korea School (까오숑한국국제학교)

References

External links
 Seoul Chinese Primary School 

1909 establishments in Korea
Chinese diaspora in Korea
Educational institutions established in 1909
International schools in Seoul
Taiwanese international schools in South Korea
Jung District, Seoul